Ben & Esther's Vegan Jewish Deli, or simply Ben & Esther's, is a vegan Jewish deli with multiple locations in the United States.

History 
Founder and owner Justin King opened the original restaurant on Sandy Boulevard in northeast Portland's Roseway neighborhood in 2019. A second location opened on Northeast Alberta in the Vernon neighborhood. Additional locations opened in San Diego and Oceanside, and on Seattle's Capitol Hill.

In 2022, the Northeast Alberta shop was vandalized by someone who spray-painted a swastika on a sign.

See also 

 History of Jews in San Diego
 Judaism in Oregon
 List of Jewish delis
 List of restaurant chains in the United States
 List of vegetarian restaurants

References

External links 

 

2019 establishments in Oregon
Capitol Hill, Seattle
Delicatessens in California
Delicatessens in Oregon
Delicatessens in Washington (state)
Jewish delicatessens in the United States
Jews and Judaism in California
Jews and Judaism in Portland, Oregon
Jews and Judaism in Seattle
Oceanside, California
Restaurant chains in the United States
Restaurants established in 2019
Restaurants in Portland, Oregon
Restaurants in San Diego
Restaurants in Seattle
Roseway, Portland, Oregon
Vegan restaurants in California
Vegan restaurants in Oregon
Vegan restaurants in Washington (state)
Vernon, Portland, Oregon